The Vál Valley Light Railway is a 6 km long 760 mm gauge railway in Hungary. It is built on part of the Bicske–Székesfehérvár railway line. The building of the line was supported by the European Union, who have since launched an OLAF investigation into the funding.

Controversy
Viktor Orbán, Prime Minister of Hungary has been accused of misusing €2M of EU money contributed to the construction of the railway. The funding request was based on 2,500 passengers using the line daily. The true ridership is one thousandth of this, and the village of Felcsút only has a population of 1,812.

Motive Power

References

Rail transport in Hungary